Kolymvari, also known as Kolymbari, is a coastal town at the southeastern end of the Rodopou peninsula on the Gulf of Chania. Kolymvari was formerly a municipality in the Chania regional unit, Crete, Greece. Since the 2011 local government reform it has been a municipal unit  of the municipality Platanias. It was also formerly part of the Kissamos province, which covered the northwest of Chania Prefecture.

Kolymvari has only rocky beaches and is thus not as popular with tourists as the nearby resorts of Maleme and Platanias. Near the town is the historic Moni Gonia Monastery. The Spiliakos river enters the sea at Kolymvari.

See also
List of communities of Chania

References

External links
Municipality description
GTP description

Populated places in Chania (regional unit)